Jennifer Lynn Servo (born Jennifer Lynn Olson, September 23, 1979 – September 16, 2002) was an American news reporter whose murder remains unsolved. Servo worked as a news reporter at KPAX-TV in Missoula during her freshman year in college at the University of Montana, and later at KECI-TV, which serves most of western Montana.

Background
Servo graduated from Columbia Falls High School in 1998; a scholarship was established in Servo's name at the school after her death. Servo stated that she had the ambition to be "the next Katie Couric" and to work for a large news network. Servo graduated from the University of Montana in May 2002.

Death
Servo was offered her first full-time news reporter job from KRBC-TV in Abilene, Texas. Just months after she began working at KRBC, she was found murdered by strangulation and head trauma in her Abilene apartment. Servo's boyfriend at the time, Ralph Sepulveda, became a prime suspect. Brian Travers, Servo's co-worker at KRBC, also became a suspect. The case remains unsolved and no arrests have been made.

In media
Servo's murder has been covered by numerous media outlets since 2002. Among the more notable are America's Most Wanted and CBS' 48 Hours Mystery under the name of "Deadline for Justice".

Servo's story was also in the September 2003 issue of Cosmopolitan magazine.

See also
List of unsolved murders

References

External links
Justiceforjennifer Servo family site

1979 births
2002 deaths
American women television journalists
Deaths by beating in the United States
Deaths by strangulation in the United States
Female murder victims
Journalists from Montana
Journalists from Texas
Journalists killed in the United States
Murdered American journalists
People from Abilene, Texas
People from Columbia Falls, Montana
People murdered in Texas
University of Montana alumni
Unsolved murders in the United States
20th-century American journalists
20th-century American women
Deaths from head injury
2002 in Texas